Qərəh is a village in the municipality of Məşrif in the Siazan Rayon of Azerbaijan.

References

Populated places in Siyazan District